Prisoners of Geography: Ten Maps That Tell You Everything You Need to Know About Global Politics is a 2015 non-fiction book about geopolitics by the British author and journalist Tim Marshall.

The author has also released a children's illustrated version of this book in 2019, Prisoners of Geography - Our World Explained in 12 Simple Maps, nominated for Waterstones Book of the Year. The Power of Geography, a sequel, was released in 2021.

Summary
Prisoners of Geography covers the geopolitical contexts and situations in several vital regions of the world. These include: Russia, China, the United States, Europe, the Arab World, South Asia (mainly focusing on the geopolitical anomalies of India and Pakistan), Africa, Japan and Korea, Latin America, and the Arctic Ocean (mainly to cover the geopolitics of the Arctic resources race).

Prisoners of Geography describes the impact geography can have on international affairs, offering an explanation for such geopolitical events as Russia's annexation of Crimea based on Russia's need to retain access to warm-water ports and China's actions in Tibet to enforce its border with India.

Reception
The book was a New York Times Best Seller and #1 Sunday Times bestseller.

Writing in the American Association of Geographers' Review of Books, Douglas Webster concluded "The book has obvious appeal, though, corroborated by its success to date, as an easy-to-read, informative primer on contemporary geographic dynamics from a geopolitical perspective." while noting that it would be criticised by exponents of global studies, who see more influence by sociological than geographical factors.

The Berlin geographer Hans-Dietrich Schultz criticises that Prisoners of Geography is based on old-geographical spatial arguments of 19th-century regional geography, which completely contradict the current state of geographical research. He criticises Marshall's expositions on the geopolitical relationship of Russia to Ukraine: "The fact that current Russian politics also has something to do with Russia's social conditions, its savage capitalism and its kleptocratic elite, remains hidden behind the penetratingly invoked spatial determinism, which must be recognised as a 'decisive factor in the course of human history'. In contrast, it should be noted: Physical objects, like Marshall's eternal mountains, plains and rivers, do not will anything of themselves. They do not act, dictate anything, force anything, seduce anything and take no sides of their own accord".

References 

British non-fiction books
Books about geopolitics
2015 non-fiction books